Theory Entertainment LLC, doing business as 300 Entertainment, is an American record label founded by Lyor Cohen, Kevin Liles, Todd Moscowitz, and Roger Gold. The label's roster includes acts across multiple genres such as hip hop, rock, pop, electronic, alternative, and country. Current artists include Young Thug, Fetty Wap, YNW Melly, Megan Thee Stallion, No Savage, Rejjie Snow, Cheat Codes, Highly Suspect, Tee Grizzley, Famous Dex, Shy Glizzy, Cobi, Meg Mac, Dae Dae, The Hunna, Maggie Lindemann, Bailey Bryan, OMB Peezy, Ice Prince, $not, Des Rocs, Savage Gasp, TLE Cinco, and Mary J Blige. It is based in New York City. The label also acts as distributor for Young Thug's record label YSL Records, whose roster includes rappers Gunna and the late Lil Keed.

In 2021, Warner Music Group acquired 300 for $400 million. In June 2022, 300 Entertainment was merged with Elektra Music Group to create the umbrella label 300 Elektra Entertainment (3EE), though both Elektra and 300 continued to maintain their separate identities as labels.

Company history

Foundation
Cohen resigned as chairman and chief executive officer of Warner Music Group's recorded music operation to start 300 with Todd Moscowitz, ex-Warner Bros president, Kevin Liles, ex-EVP Warner Music, and Roger Gold, former SVP of the office of the chairman and CEO at Warner Music. Cohen, Liles, and Moscowitz had also worked together at Def Jam, which Cohen had run in the 1980s and 1990s.

It was announced that singer Eric Bellinger had been signed to 300 Entertainment. In April 2014, Atlantic Records A&R DJ Drama stated that Atlanta rapper Young Thug had been signed to 300 Entertainment, In June 2014, it was revealed that Atlanta hip hop group Migos were also signed to the label. In early 2014, Lyor Cohen quietly signed Conrad Sewell after Sewell had been passed on by most of the major labels. The day after signing with 300, the Australian singer received offers from virtually every label that had passed on him, for, in some cases, "well over $1 million."

As of 2017, Fetty Wap's "Trap Queen" is the label's biggest single to date, going 10× platinum. Its first pop hit was Cheat Codes' "No Promises" featuring Demi Lovato. Its first country pop artist to be signed is Bailey Bryan.

Exit of Cohen
In September 2016, Lyor Cohen announced his exit from 300. Following this announcement, Kevin Liles assumed the role of CEO. Liles would make appearances to follow in The Wall Street Journal and on MSNBC to discuss his role and the label.

Partnerships

Funding
The company is backed by a wide range of investors, including Google, investment firm Columbus Nova, Israeli-American hedge fund billionaire Noam Gottesman's TOMS Capital, former Warner Music digital chief Alex Zubillaga, and Kemado Records' co-founder Andres Santo Domingo. The investment agreements were pulled together by media investment banker Aryeh Bourkoff and Ori Winitze of LionTree.

Atlantic Records
Atlantic Records signed a distribution deal to distribute all of 300's content in November 2013.

+1 Records
In 2014, 300 announced that +1 Records had become an official partner label of the company.

YSL Records
In November 2016, Young Thug started YSL (Young Stoner Life) Records as an imprint under 300 Entertainment. Artists on the imprint include Gunna, Lil Keed, Strick, T-Shyne, Lil Duke, Karlae, Yak Gotti, Yung Kayo, HiDoraah, and Dolly White.

Unauthorized Entertainment
In February 2017, the label's Senior Vice President of A&R, Selim Bouab, launched the label Unauthorized Entertainment under 300.

Murder Inc. Records
In June 2017, it was announced that 300 Entertainment had partnered with Murder Inc. Records.

Undercover Prodigy
In September 2017, Hopsin did an interview with HardKnocktv stating that he had signed with 300. His single "The Purge" was released through 300 Entertainment and Undercover Prodigy.
On November 24, 2017, Hopsin Released his album No Shame and debuted at 42 on the Billboard 200. Both Kevin Liles and Hopsin has referred to the deal as a partnership for 300 and Undercover Prodigy.

Artists

References

External links
 Official site

Warner Music labels
Atlantic Records
American companies established in 2012
Record labels established in 2012
American record labels
American hip hop record labels